Corn Ranch, or Launch Site One, is a spaceport in the West Texas town of Van Horn, Texas. The  land parcel was purchased by Internet billionaire Jeff Bezos. Current launch license and experimental permits from the US government Federal Aviation Administration authorize flights of New Shepard rockets. The first flight test took place on November 13, 2006 with the goal of providing commercial tourist flights. Blue Origin’s first human spaceflight launched at Corn Ranch on July 20, 2021. The flight, dubbed NS-16, carried founder Jeff Bezos, his brother Mark Bezos, test pilot and Mercury 13 member Wally Funk, and Dutchman Oliver Daemen on a suborbital flight aboard New Shepard 4.

, Blue Origin has a staff of approximately 50 supporting the West Texas facility.

In addition to the suborbital launch pads, the West Texas site includes a number of rocket engine test stands. Engine test cells to support both hydrolox, methalox and storable propellant engines are present.

Included are three test cells just for testing the methalox BE-4 engine alone: two full test cells that can support full-thrust and full-duration burns, as well as one that supports short-duration, high-pressure preburner tests, to "refine the ignition sequence and understand the start transients."

See also

References

External links 
 

Spaceports in the United States
Buildings and structures in Culberson County, Texas
Blue Origin